Jabi of Silla (r. 458–479, died 479), also known by his title Jabi Maripgan, was the 20th ruler of the Korean kingdom of Silla.  He was the eldest son of King Nulji, and his mother was the daughter of King Silseong.  He married the daughter of Kim Misaheun.

In 474, Goguryeo launched a massive assault on Baekje, Silla's neighbor to the west.  Jabi sent troops to aid Baekje, forming a historic alliance between the two kingdoms which lasted into the 6th century.

Family
Grandfather: King Naemul
Grandmother: Lady Boban, the daughter of King Michu
Father: King Nulji of Silla
Mother: Queen Aro, of the Kim clan (아로부인 김씨), daughter of King Silseong
Wife: 
Queen Kim, of the Kim clan (왕후김씨), daughter of Kim Misaheun (김미사흔)
Son: Eldest Prince
Son: Second Prince
Son: King Soji of Silla
Daughter: Princess Junmyeong of the Kim clan (준명공주김씨)
Lady Kim, daughter of  Kim Mul-ryeok (김물력)

See also
Three Kingdoms of Korea
List of Korean monarchs
List of Silla people

References

Silla rulers
479 deaths
5th-century monarchs in Asia
Year of birth unknown
5th-century Korean people